Ohgayarindo Tameike is an earthfill dam located in Toyama prefecture in Japan. The dam is used for irrigation. The catchment area of the dam is 3.6 km2. The dam impounds about 2  ha of land when full and can store 164 thousand cubic meters of water. The construction of the dam was started on 1928 and completed in 1931.

References

Dams in Toyama Prefecture
1931 establishments in Japan